A burial vault is a structural underground tomb. It houses the casket and protects them through a lined, sealed container. A burial vault shields the casket from maintenance equipment and resists water. Different levels of burial vaults are offered, such as premium, basic, and standard protection.

It is a stone- or brick-lined underground space or 'burial' chamber for the interment of a dead body or bodies. These burial tombs were originally and are still often vaulted and usually have stone slab entrances. They are often privately owned and used for specific family or other groups, but usually stand beneath a public religious building, such as a church, or in a churchyard or cemetery. A crypt may be used as a burial vault.

References 

Burial monuments and structures
Subterranea (geography)